Redesdale and Wise William is the 246th ballad from the Child Ballads. The ballad tells of a man who wagers and loses his lands over an attempt to win a woman's affection.

Synopsis
While "drinking wine" and having "an unruly time", Redesdale tells William he can win the love of any lady.  William rashly says his sister will not give him her favor, and bets his head against Redesdale's lands.  Redesdale throws him into prison, but he writes a letter and sends it to his sister. Redesdale's attempt to woo her are unsuccessful even at getting a glimpse of her. When he sets the house  afire, in different variants, the women escape or a shower puts outs the blaze. Redesdale admits defeat, frees William, and gives him his lands.

References

External links

Redesdale and Wise William

Child Ballads
British folklore